The German Gymnasium is a building located at 1 Kings Boulevard (formerly 26 Pancras Road), close to the Kings Cross and St Pancras railway stations in the London Borough of Camden.

The building, which is currently used as a German themed bar and restaurant, is a legacy of London’s once large and thriving German community.

Construction and use
It was constructed in 1864–65 for the German Gymnastics Society, a sporting association established in London in 1861 by Ernst Ravenstein. The National Olympian Association used the Gymnasium as one of the venues for its first ever Games here in 1866, shortly after the German Gymnasium was opened.

Designed by Edward A. Gruning and built by Piper and Wheeler, the German Gymnasium is a -story multi-coloured stock brick building with a roof constructed from laminated wood trusses with cast iron fillets. The roof is an important early example of the use of laminated timber to give broad spans.  The roof trusses – some 20m wide – are as experimented with but replaced at nearby King's Cross Station.

London's German community
London once had a large german community. Poor Germans, especially Jews, typically settled in the East End, wealthy or well-connected Germans headed for the West End, while many professional and middle-class Germans settled in north London areas such as Islington and St Pancras. 

The area around nearby Charlotte Street, also a part of the parish and borough of St Pancras, was so well known as a German centre that it became known as Charlottenstrasse, after the famous Berlin street of that name, Charlottenstraße.

Damage and preservation
Part of the western end of the building was lost to make way for the construction of the new international rail terminal of St Pancras.  A new end wall has been created in keeping with the rest of the structure.

The building has been listed Grade II on the National Heritage List for England since January 1976.

Nearby Tube stations
 King's Cross St Pancras

References

1865 establishments in England
1860s in London
Grade II listed buildings in the London Borough of Camden
Gyms in the United Kingdom
Kings Cross, London
Sport in the London Borough of Camden